Sydenham House is a historic house on Old Road to Bloomfield, south of Heller Parkway in Newark, Essex County, New Jersey, United States.

Construction took place around 1711. It was added to the National Register of Historic Places in 1970.

See also 
 National Register of Historic Places listings in Essex County, New Jersey
 List of the oldest buildings in New Jersey

References

External links
 Oldhouses.com

Buildings and structures in Newark, New Jersey
Houses on the National Register of Historic Places in New Jersey
Houses completed in 1711
Houses in Essex County, New Jersey
National Register of Historic Places in Newark, New Jersey
Stone houses in New Jersey
1711 establishments in New Jersey